Lobatto is a surname. Notable people with the surname include:

Rehuel Lobatto (1797–1866), Dutch mathematician
Samantha Lobatto (born 1988), Indian cricketer